Marcel Albert (25 November 1917 – 23 August 2010) was a French World War II flying ace who flew for the air forces of the Vichy government and the Free French forces, and also for the Soviet Air Force and the Royal Air Force. He was born in Paris.

Background 
Albert grew up in a working-class family. He became a mechanic, building gearboxes for Renault, and was accepted for pilot training in the French Armée de l'Air in May 1938. After primary and advanced training, he was posted at the fighter training center in Chartres, where he flew Bloch 152, Morane-Saulnier MS.406 and Hawk 75 fighters.

World War II 
In February 1940 Albert was assigned to Groupe de Chasse I/3, a unit operating France's top fighter, the Dewoitine D.520. When German troops invaded France in May 1940, his squadron was redeployed to the Reims airfield. On 14 May 1940, Albert shot down a Do 17 bomber and later that day, a Messerschmitt Bf 109 fighter, although this victory was not confirmed. He also earned a probable victory over a Heinkel He 111 bomber before the armistice.

Under the Vichy government, his squadron was redeployed to Algeria where Albert flew a few missions against the British forces in Gibraltar. On 14 October he and two other pilots defected and surrendered their airplanes to the British.

Having reached England, Albert joined the RAF and flew 47 missions in Spitfires with 340 Squadron.

In late 1942, Albert joined the Normandie fighter group, a Free French fighter unit that was being sent to the Soviet Union to help fight the Germans. The Normandie group entered the fight in April 1943, flying Russian-built Yak-1 fighters, and later Yak-9s and Yak-3s.

Albert quickly proved to be one of Normandie's best pilots. His first kill was over a Focke-Wulf Fw 189 on 16 June 1943. In July he claimed 3 more, and he was given command of the 1st escadrille on 4 September 1943. During the offensive against Eastern Prussia in October 1944, he scored 7 victories. 
 
His score totaled 23 victories (including 15 shared) in 262 combat missions, making him the second highest-scoring French ace of World War II. On 27 November 1944 he was awarded the Soviet Union's highest decoration, the Gold Star and title of "Hero of the Soviet Union" — an award rarely issued to foreigners.

Postwar 
After the war Albert flew as a test pilot in 1946 and was later sent to Czechoslovakia as air attaché, where he met his future wife, an employee at the American embassy. In 1948, he left the military and moved to the United States with his wife, and lived in Chipley, Florida, then his last two years in Harlingen, Texas, in the Rio Grande Valley. Albert died there on 23 August 2010.

Awards 
Grand'Croix de la Légion d'Honneur (Journal Officiel de la République française dated 14 April 2010) 
Compagnon de la Libération
Croix de Guerre 1939–1945 with 15 palms and 3 silver gilt stars
Médaille de la Résistance with rosette
Hero of the Soviet Union (27 November 1944) 
Order of Lenin (27 November 1944) 
Order of the Red Banner
Czechoslovak War Cross
Order of the Patriotic War 1st class (11 March 1985)

List of credited aerial victories

References

External links 
"French fighter pilots 1939–1945." Aerostories''
Interview with Marcel Albert at simulation-france-magazine.com (French language)

1917 births
2010 deaths
French World War II flying aces
French Royal Air Force pilots of World War II
French emigrants to the United States
Free French Air Forces officers
Foreign Heroes of the Soviet Union
Companions of the Liberation
Grand Croix of the Légion d'honneur
Recipients of the Croix de Guerre 1939–1945 (France)
Recipients of the Resistance Medal
Recipients of the Order of Lenin
Recipients of the Order of the Red Banner
Recipients of the Czechoslovak War Cross
French expatriates in the Soviet Union
Heroes of the Soviet Union
Military personnel from Paris
People from Harlingen, Texas
People from Chipley, Florida
Air attachés
French Air Force personnel of World War II